In graph theory, the Henson graph  is an undirected infinite graph, the unique countable homogeneous graph that does not contain an -vertex clique but that does contain all -free finite graphs as induced subgraphs. For instance,  is a triangle-free graph that contains all finite triangle-free graphs.

These graphs are named after C. Ward Henson, who published a construction for them (for all ) in 1971. The first of these graphs, is also called the homogeneous triangle-free graph or the universal triangle-free graph.

Construction
To construct these graphs, Henson orders the vertices of the Rado graph into a sequence with the property that, for every finite set  of vertices, there are infinitely many vertices having  as their set of earlier neighbors. (The existence of such a sequence uniquely defines the Rado graph.) He then defines  to be the induced subgraph of the Rado graph formed by removing the final vertex (in the sequence ordering) of every -clique of the Rado graph.

Universality
That is,  is a universal graph for the family of -clique-free graphs.

Because there exist -clique-free graphs of arbitrarily large chromatic number, the Henson graphs have infinite chromatic number. More strongly, if a Henson graph  is partitioned into any finite number of induced subgraphs, then at least one of these subgraphs includes all -clique-free finite graphs as induced subgraphs.

Symmetry
Like the Rado graph,  contains a bidirectional Hamiltonian path such that any symmetry of the path is a symmetry of the whole graph. However, this is not true for  when : for these graphs, every automorphism of the graph has more than one orbit.

References

Parametric families of graphs
Infinite graphs